Norman Mitchell (1918–2001) was an English television, stage and film actor

Norman Mitchell may also refer to

 Norman Mitchell (sportsman) (1900–1973), Australian cricketer and footballer
 Norm Mitchell (born 1949), Australian rules footballer
 Norman Mitchell (rugby league), rugby league footballer of the 1950s
 Norman Mitchell-Innes (1914–2006), known as Mandy Mitchell-Innes, English cricketer
 Lieutenant Colonel Coulson Norman Mitchell (1889–1978), Canadian soldier and recipient of the Victoria Cross
 Norman Mitchell Lake, a lake in central Manitoba, named after Lieutenant Colonel Coulson Norman Mitchell